Udachny (lit. successful or lucky; , Udaçnay) is a town in Mirninsky District of the Sakha Republic, Russia, located on the Markha River,  from Mirny, the administrative center of the district. As of the 2010 Census, its population was 12,613.

History

The Udachnaya pipe diamond deposit was discovered in 1955. Due to its isolated location, it was not exploited until the 1960s. In conjunction with the beginnings of diamond production, the urban-type settlement of Udachny was founded in 1968; town status was granted to it in 1987.

As part of a plan to create the basin for a tailings dam for the nearby diamond mine, a 1.7 kiloton atomic bomb was detonated  underground near Udachny on October 2, 1974. Original plans had called for eight similar explosions to be conducted; however, due to radioactive fallout being far greater than expected, the project was halted after the first blast.

Administrative and municipal status
As an inhabited locality, Udachny is classified as a town under district jurisdiction. Within the framework of administrative divisions, it is, together with one rural locality (the selo of Polyarny), incorporated within Mirninsky District as the Town of Udachny. As a municipal division, the Town of Udachny is incorporated within Mirninsky Municipal District as Udachny Urban Settlement.

Economy
Diamond mining remains the principal economic activity in the town. Udachny is the second most important diamond production site after Mirny for the state-owned ALROSA corporation. It is served by Polyarny Airport 12km outside of town.

Climate
Udachny has an extreme subarctic climate (Köppen climate classification Dfd). Precipitation is quite low, but is significantly higher in summer than at other times of the year.

References

Notes

Sources
Official website of the Sakha Republic. Registry of the Administrative-Territorial Divisions of the Sakha Republic. Mirninsky District. 

Cities and towns in the Sakha Republic
Cities and towns built in the Soviet Union
Populated places established in 1968